Igor Ivanovich Sechin (born 7 September 1960) is a Russian oligarch and a government official, considered a close ally and "de facto deputy" of Vladimir Putin.

Sechin has been a confidant of Russian leader Vladimir Putin since the early 1990s. Sechin was chief of staff to Putin when he was the deputy mayor of St. Petersburg in 1994. When Putin became President in 2000, Sechin became his deputy chief of staff, overseeing security services and energy issues in Russia. Putin appointed Sechin as chairman of Rosneft, the Russian state oil company in 2004. He was as Deputy Prime Minister of Russia in Vladimir Putin's cabinet from 2008 to 2012. He is currently the chief executive officer, president and chairman of the management board of Rosneft.  

Sechin is often described as one of Putin's most conservative counselors and the leader of the Kremlin's Siloviki faction, a lobby gathering former security services agents. He has been sanctioned by some foreign governments following the Russian invasion of Ukraine. His nickname is Darth Vader.

Career

Sechin graduated from Leningrad State University in 1984 as a linguist, fluent in Portuguese and French. In the 1980s, Sechin worked in Mozambique. He was officially a Soviet interpreter. From 1991 to 1996, he worked at Saint Petersburg mayor's office, and became a chief of staff of the first deputy mayor, Vladimir Putin in 1994. From 1996 to 1997, Sechin served as a deputy of Vladimir Putin, who worked in the presidential property management department. From 1997 to 1998, Sechin was the chief of the general department of the main control directorate attached to the president, led by Putin. In August 1999, he was appointed head of the secretariat of the prime minister of Russia, Putin. From 24 November 1999 until 11 January 2000, Sechin was the first deputy chief of the Russian presidential administration.

Between 31 December 1999 and May 2008, he was deputy chief of Putin's administration. In May 2008, he was appointed by President Dmitry Medvedev as a deputy prime minister in a move considered as a demotion. According to Stratfor, "Sechin acts as boss of Russia's gigantic state oil company Rosneft and commands the loyalty of the FSB. Thus, he represents the FSB's hand in Russia's energy sector."

On 27 July 2004, Sechin became the successful and influential chairman of the board of directors of JSC Rosneft, which swallowed up the assets of jailed tycoon Khodorkovsky's Yukos. He has additionally been president of Rosneft since May 2012.  Khodorkovsky has accused Sechin of plotting to have him arrested and plundering his oil company: "The second as well as the first case were organised by Sechin. He orchestrated the first case against me out of greed and the second out of cowardice." In 2008, Sechin allegedly blocked the replacement of the AAR consortium with Gazprom in the TNK-BP joint venture.

In 2008, Sechin was involved with the BP oil company and did private negotiations with the BP's CEO Bob Dudley. In 2008, Hugo Chávez said that the idea for Venezuelan nuclear energy program came from Sechin. Sechin negotiated deals on weapons and nuclear technology deliveries to Venezuela. In July 2009, Sechin negotiated deals with Cuba that brought Russia into deep-water drilling in the Gulf of Mexico.

Sechin also presides over the board of directors of the United Shipbuilding Corporation, and helped with negotiations with France over the purchase of four Mistral-class ships. Sechin argued that two ships should be constructed in Russia and two in France, as opposed to the initial offer that only one be constructed in Russia. Piotr Żochowski, of the Polish Center for Eastern Studies, argued that "it cannot be ruled out that Sechin's stance on this issue results from his personal financial involvement in the St Petersburg shipbuilding industry".

On 12 April 2011, Sechin resigned from the board of Rosneft upon President Medvedev's 31 March 2011 order for senior officials to resign from large companies. After Vladimir Putin became President of Russia in May 2012, he later resigned as vice prime minister on 21 May 2012 and rejoined the executive board of Rosneft as chairman and became the executive secretary for the Russia Federation's commission on the development strategy of the fuel and energy complex and environmental safety in June.

In December 2014, a CNBC article noted that Sechin is "widely believed to be Russia's second-most powerful person" after President Putin. In December 2017, The Guardian noted that Sechin "is widely seen as the second most powerful man in Russia after Vladimir Putin".

The Steele dossier alleged that Sechin met with Carter Page in 2016 as a representative of the Donald Trump presidential campaign, and offered Trump the brokerage of a 19.6% private share in Rosneft in exchange for lifting sanctions imposed following the 2014 Russian intervention in Ukraine. The 2019 Mueller Report did not corroborate those allegations, and neither Page nor Sechin were indicted with any crime.

Sechin was instrumental in the arrest and trial of Putin's former minister of economy, Alexei Ulyukaev, charged and found guilty of soliciting a bribe from Sechin. The verdict was delivered after hearing testimony from Sechin in a closed trial, and is another indicator, according to the Financial Times, of the power wielded by Sechin in Russian politics.

In November 2018, Sechin released a statement at the first Russian-Chinese Energy Business Forum in Beijing, about increased levels of cooperation between Rosneft and Chinese owned energy companies, citing "increased protectionism and threats of trade wars" as a reason for the cooperation. Agreements of cooperation were signed between Rosneft and Chinese Hengli Group and include expansion in exploration as well as production and refining.

Sanctions
On 20 March 2014, the United States government sanctioned Sechin in response to the Russian government's role in the ongoing unrest in Ukraine. The sanctions include a travel ban to the United States, freezing of all assets of Sechin in the United States and a ban on business transactions between American citizens and corporations and Sechin and businesses he owns. Closely associated with Sechin, Rosneft is on the Sectoral Sanctions Identification (SSI) List.

On 28 February 2022, in relation to the Russian invasion of Ukraine, the European Union blacklisted Sechin and had all his assets frozen. In March, the UK government imposed sanctions which involved freezing Sechin's assets and a travel ban. Two superyachts belonging to Sechin, the Amore Vero and the Crescent, had been seized by Spanish and Italian authorities by mid-March as a consequence.

Personal life
Sechin has been married twice. He divorced his first wife Marina Sechina in 2011. Marina increased her wealth after the divorce and made The Paradise Papers and, as of 2017, owns a mansion at Serebryany Bor in the Khoroshyovo-Mnyovniki District of the North-Western Administrative Okrug of Moscow. After 5 years of marriage, he divorced his second wife Olga Rozhkova (born 1990) on 14 June 2017. Olga sailed on the  St Princess Olga which was built by Oceanco in 2012 and delivered in 2013. After the divorce, the super-yacht was renamed Amore Vero ("True Love") in 2017.

With Marina, he has a daughter, Inga (b. 1982), who graduated from the Saint Petersburg Mining University and, as of 2018, works at Surgutneftegasbank. Inga married Dmitry Ustinov (b. 1979), a Russian intelligence agent and graduate of the FSB Academy, and son of former Prosecutor General and current Plenipotentiary Envoy to the Southern Federal District Vladimir Ustinov, in 2003. Inga and Dmitry had a son on 4 July 2005. She divorced him and, later, she married Timerbulat Karimov (Russian: Тимербулат Каримов) (b. 1974), a former investment banker and senior vice-president of VTB Bank from October 2011 until February 2014. He is on the board of directors for the Russian Copper Company (Russian: АО «Русская медная компания») which is the third largest in Russia and owned by Igor Altushkin. Since September 2015, she is the only owner of the Moscow based company Khoroshiye Lyudi or Good People (Russian: ООО «Хорошие люди»), which on 4 December 2015, became a 40% owner of the Novgorod Agropark (Russian: ООО «Новгородский агропарк»), a turkey farm located in Veliky Novgorod.

After the demotion of Vladimir Ustinov in 2006, Sechin reportedly arranged the appointment of Alexander Bastrykin, another ally of his, as Chairman of the Investigative Committee of the Prosecutor General's Office in 2007 in order to retain his influence.

His son from his marriage to Marina, Ivan (b. 1989), graduated from the Lomonosov business school at Moscow State University and works closely with Igor, as of 2018, as First Deputy Director of the Department of Joint Offshore Projects at Rosneft. Ivan was sanctioned by the U.S. in February 2022.

Varvara is his daughter from his marriage to Olga.

Notes

References

External links

Sechin's profile and assets on Russian Asset Tracker
Biography, Lenta.ru (in Russian).

1960 births
Living people
Businesspeople from Saint Petersburg
20th-century Russian politicians
21st-century Russian businesspeople
Russian businesspeople in the oil industry
GRU officers
Arms traders
Rosneft
Russian individuals subject to the U.S. Department of the Treasury sanctions
Russian individuals subject to European Union sanctions
21st-century Russian politicians
Politicians from Saint Petersburg
Russian oligarchs
Specially Designated Nationals and Blocked Persons List
Russian individuals subject to United Kingdom sanctions